Oncopera tindalei is a moth of the family Hepialidae. It is found in New South Wales, Australia. It was named after Australian entomologist Norman Tindale.

The larvae are subterranean and probably feed on the roots and bases of grasses in native and sown pastures.

References

Moths described in 1966
Hepialidae